The British School Yangon (BSY) is a private international school based on the British curriculum, located in the city of Yangon, Myanmar. The school currently provides schooling to students aged 3–16 and accepted its first Sixth Form cohort in August 2020.

BSY is part of Nord Anglia Education (NAE), a global organisation of 66 schools in 29 countries.

History 

The British School Yangon was founded in 2011 by the British Schools Foundation (BSF) a UK registered non-profit organization. It was officially opened by British Ambassador Andrew Patrick in August 2014 and in 2018 the school relocated to a larger site.

BSY joined the Nord Anglia Education family of schools in December 2017. Its new campus (The one in use now) was bought by the BSF foundation before its sale to Nord Anglia. The changes officially came into effect in late 2018 after the last year with BSF however merchandise and uniforms began use during late 2019.

Location 
The school is located at Taw Win Street, Mayangone, Yangon. Early Years, Primary and Secondary students are all on the same site.

Curriculum 
In addition to the British national curriculum, the school also provides additional learning opportunities for pupils, such as through sports, music, drama and educational trips. These trips start when the pupil is in Year 3.

Global initiatives 

BSY partners global organisations including the Juilliard School, Massachusetts Institute of Technology, and UNICEF. Through these partnerships, students at BSY have access to international events and activities. BSY also has connections with King's College London to offer an Executive Masters in Education for their teachers.

References

External links 
 The British School Yangon

2011 establishments in Myanmar
International schools in Myanmar
Educational institutions established in 2011
Buildings and structures in Yangon
Nord Anglia Education